Indigenous cuisine of the Americas includes all cuisines and food practices of the Indigenous peoples of the Americas. Contemporary Native peoples retain a varied culture of traditional foods, along with the addition of some post-contact foods that have become customary and even iconic of present-day Indigenous American social gatherings (for example, frybread). Foods like cornbread, turkey, cranberry, blueberry, hominy and mush have been adopted into the cuisine of the broader United States population from Native American cultures.

In other cases, documents from the early periods of Indigenous American contact with European, African, and Asian peoples have allowed the recovery and revitalization of Indigenous food practices that had formerly passed out of popularity.

The most important Indigenous American crops have generally included Indian corn (or maize, from the Taíno name for the plant), beans, squash, pumpkins, sunflowers, wild rice, sweet potatoes, tomatoes, peppers, peanuts, avocados, papayas, potatoes and chocolate.

Indigenous cuisine of the Americas uses domesticated and wild native ingredients. As the Americas cover a large range of biomes, and there are more than 574 currently federally recognized Native American tribes in the US alone, Indigenous cuisine can vary significantly by region and culture. For example, North American Native cuisine differs from Southwestern and Mexican cuisine in its simplicity and directness of flavor.

Indigenous cuisine of North America

Country food

Country food, in Canada, refers to the  traditional diets of the Indigenous peoples in Canada (known in Canada as First Nations, Metis, and Inuit), especially in remote northern regions where Western food is an expensive import, and traditional foods are still relied upon.

The Government of the Northwest Territories estimated in 2015 that nearly half of Northwest Territories residents in smaller communities relied on country food for 75% of their meat and fish intake; in larger communities, the percentage was lower, with the lowest percentage relying on country foods (4%) being in Yellowknife, the capital and only "large community".

The most common country foods in the Northwest Territories area include mammals and birds (caribou, moose, ducks, geese, seals, hare, grouse, ptarmigan), fish (lake trout, char, inconnu, whitefish, pike, burbot) and berries (blueberries, cranberries, blackberries, cloudberries).

In the eastern Canadian Arctic, Inuit consume a diet of foods that are fished, hunted, and gathered locally. This may include caribou, walrus, ringed seal, bearded seal, beluga whale, polar bear, berries, and fireweed.

The cultural value attached to certain game species, and certain parts, varies.  For example, in the James Bay region, a 1982 study found that beluga whale meat was principally used as dog food, whereas the blubber, or muktuk was a "valued delicacy".  Value also varies by age, with Inuit preferring younger ring seals, and often using the older ones for dog food.

Contaminants in country foods are a public health concern in Northern Canada; volunteers are tested to track the spread of industrial chemicals from emitters (usually in the South) into the northern food web via the air and water.

In 2017, the Government of the Northwest Territories committed to using country foods in the soon-to-open Stanton Territorial Hospital, despite the challenges of obtaining, inspecting, and preparing sufficient quantities of wild game and plants.

In Southern Canada, wild foods (especially meats) are relatively rare in restaurants, due to wildlife conservation rules against selling hunted meat, as well as strict meat inspection rules. There is a cultural divide between rural and remote communities that rely on wild foods, and urban Canadians (the majority), who have little or no experience with them.

Eastern Native American cuisine

The essential staple foods of the Indigenous peoples of the Eastern Woodlands have traditionally been corn (also known as maize), beans, and squash, known as "The Three Sisters" because they were planted interdependently: the beans grew up the tall stalks of the corn, while the squash spread out at the base of the three plants and provided protection and support for the root systems.

Maple syrup is another essential food staple of the Eastern Woodlands peoples.  Tree sap is collected from sugar maple trees during the beginning of springtime when the nights are still cold. Birch bark containers are used in the process of making maple syrup, maple cakes, maple sugar, and maple taffy.  When the sap is boiled to a certain temperature, different variations of maple food products are created. When the sap starts to thicken, it can be poured into the snow to make taffy.

Since the first colonists of New England had to adapt their foods to the local crops and resources, the Native influences of Southern New England Algonquian cuisine form a significant part of New England cuisine with dishes such as cornbread, succotash and Johnnycakes and ingredients such as corn, cranberries and local species of clam still enjoyed in the region today.

The Wabanaki tribal nations and other eastern woodlands peoples have made nut milk and infant formula made from nuts and cornmeal, while the Cherokee nation made Kanuchi soup from hickory nuts.

Southeastern Native American cuisine
Southeastern Native American culture has formed the cornerstone of Southern cuisine from its origins through the present day. From Southeastern Native American culture came one of the main staples of the Southern diet: corn (maize), either ground into meal or limed with an alkaline salt to make hominy, using a Native American technique known as nixtamalization. Corn is used to make all kinds of dishes from the familiar cornbread and grits.

Though a less important staple, potatoes were also adopted from Native American cuisine and have been used in many ways similar to corn. Native Americans introduced the first non-Native American Southerners to many other vegetables still familiar on southern tables. Squash, pumpkin, many types of beans, tomatoes, many types of peppers, and sassafras all came to the settlers via Indigenous peoples. The Virginia Algonquian word pawcohiccora means hickory-nut meat or a nut milk drink made from it.

Many fruits are available in this region. Muscadines, blackberries, raspberries, and many other wild berries were part of Southern Native Americans' diet.

Southeastern Native Americans traditionally supplement their diets with meats derived from the hunting of native game. Venison has always been an important meat staple, due to the abundance of white-tailed deer in the area. Rabbits, squirrels, opossums, and raccoons are also common.

Livestock, adopted from Europeans, in the form of hogs and cattle, are also kept. Aside from the more commonly consumed parts of the animal, it is traditional to also eat organ meats such as liver, brains, and intestines. This tradition remains today in hallmark dishes like chitterlings, commonly called chitlins, which are the fried large intestines of hogs; livermush, a common dish in the Carolinas made from hog liver; and pork brains and eggs. The fat of the animals, particularly of hogs, is traditionally rendered and used for cooking and frying. Many of the early settlers were taught Southeastern Native American cooking methods.

Selected dishes 
 Chitterling (Chitlin), usually made from the large intestines of a hog
 Cornbread
 Hominy, coarsely ground corn used to make grits
 Hush puppy, small, savory, deep-fried round ball made from cornmeal-based batter
 Indian fritter
 Kanuchi, soup made from ground hickory nuts
 Livermush, pig liver, parts of pig heads, cornmeal and spices
 Sofkee, corn soup or drink, sour

Great Plains Native American cuisine
Indigenous peoples of the Great Plains and Canadian Prairies or Plains Indians have historically relied heavily on American bison (American buffalo) as a staple food source. One traditional method of preparation is to cut the meat into thin slices then dry it, either over a slow fire or in the hot sun, until it is hard and brittle. In this form it can last for months, making it a main ingredient to be combined with other foods, or eaten on its own.

One such use could be pemmican, a concentrated mixture of fat and protein, and fruits such as cranberries, Saskatoon berries, blueberries, cherries, chokecherries, and currants are sometimes added.  Many parts of the bison were utilized and prepared in numerous ways, including: "boiled meat, tripe soup perhaps thickened with brains, roasted intestines, jerked/smoked meat, and raw kidneys, liver, tongue sprinkled with gall or bile were eaten immediately after a kill."

The animals that Great Plains Indians consumed, like bison, deer, and antelope, were grazing animals. Due to this, they were high in omega-3 fatty acids, an essential acid that many diets lack.

When asked to state traditional staple foods, a group of Plains elders identified prairie turnips (Psoralea esculenta), called timpsula or Tin'psila in the Lakota language group; fruits (chokecherries, June berries, plums, blueberries, cranberries, strawberries, buffalo berries, gooseberries); potatoes; squash; dried meats (venison, buffalo, jack rabbit, pheasant, and prairie chicken); and wild rice as being these staple foods.

"We landed at a Watlala village 200 men of Flatheads of 25 houses 50 canoes built of Straw, we were treated verry kindly by them, they gave us round root near the size of a hens egg roasted which they call Wap-to (wapato) to eate . . . . which they roasted in the embers until they became Soft"

—William Clark, Lewis and Clark Expedition

Wapato (Sagittaria latifolia) has a number of varieties and is found growing in damp marsh area around ponds, lakes, rivers, and streams.  The edible rhizomes were gathered and could be roasted in the embers of a fire, or dried, ground and the meal pressed into a cake which "served well as bread" as noted by Meriwether Lewis of the Lewis and Clark Expedition.  They are known today as broadleaf arrowhead, arrowhead, duckroot, or duck-potato.

Western Indigenous cuisine
In the Pacific Northwest, traditional diets include salmon and other fish, seafood, mushrooms, berries, roots and tubers, and meats such as deer, duck, and rabbit.

In contrast to the Easterners, the Northwestern peoples are traditionally hunter-gatherers, primarily. The generally mild climate led to the development of an  economy based on year-round abundant food supplies, rather than having to rely upon seasonal agriculture.

In what is now California, acorns can be ground into a flour that has at times served as the principal foodstuff for about 75 percent of the population, and dried meats can be prepared during the dry season.

Southwestern Indigenous cuisine
Ancestral Puebloans of the present-day Four Corners region of the United States, comprising Arizona, Colorado, New Mexico, and Utah, initially practiced subsistence agriculture by cultivating maize, beans, squash, sunflower seeds, and pine nuts from the pinyon pine, and game meat including venison and cuniculture, and freshwater fish such as Rio Grande cutthroat trout and rainbow trout are also traditional foods in the region.

Ancestral Puebloans are also known for their basketry and pottery, indicating both an agricultural surplus that needed to be carried and stored, and clay pot cooking. Grinding stones have been used to grind maize into meal for cooking. Archaeological digs indicate a very early domestication of turkeys for food.

New Mexican cuisine is heavily rooted in both Pueblo and Hispano food traditions, and is a prevalent cuisine in the American Southwest, especially in New Mexico.

The 2002 Foods of the Southwest Indian Nations won a James Beard Award, the first Native American cookbook so honored. Publishers had told the author, Lois Ellen Frank, that there was no such thing as Native American cuisine.

Alaska Native cuisine 
Alaska Native cuisine consists of nutrient-dense foods such as seal, fish (salmon), and moose.  Along with these, berries (huckleberries) and bird eggs are traditionally consumed by Alaska Natives.

Seal, walruses, and polar bears are the large game that Alaska Natives hunt. Smaller game includes whitefish, Arctic char, Arctic hare, and ptarmigan.

Due to weather, edible plants like berries are only available to be consumed in the summer, so people have a diet very high in fat and protein, but low in carbohydrates.

The game that is hunted is also used for clothing. The intestines of large mammals are used to make waterproof clothing and caribou fur is used to make warm clothing.

Dishes

Acorn bread
Acorn mush, from the Miwok people
Akutaq, also called "Eskimo ice cream", made from caribou or moose tallow and meat, berries, seal oil, and sometimes fish, whipped together with snow or water
Bannock, a bread of European origin, cooked over an open fire
 Bean bread, made with corn meal and beans, popular among the Cherokee
Bird brain stew, from the Cree nation
Black drink or asi, a Southeastern ceremonial drink made from the yaupon holly
Buffalo stew, from the Lakota and Cherokee people, also called tanka-me-a-lo
Chinook olives, a type of cured acorn eaten by the aboriginal people of the Columbia River Valley
Cornbread and corn pone—the word pone derives from the word for 'bread' in some Eastern Algonquian languages, such as Powhatan apon and Lenape ahpòn
Dried meats like jerky and smoked salmon strips
Filé powder, made from sassafras leaves, used by the Choctaw for flavoring and thickening soups and stews as well as for herbal medicine
Frybread, a dish made from ingredients distributed to Native Americans living on reservations 
Green chili stew
Hopi tea, an herbal tea made from Thelesperma megapotamicum
Mutton stew, from the Navajo people
Nokake, Algonquian hoecakes, made of cornmeal
Nut milk, from the Wabanaki
Pemmican, a concentrated food consisting of dried pulverized meat, dried berries, and rendered fat.

Piki bread, from the Hopi people
Psindamoakan, a Lenape hunter's food made of parched cornmeal mixed with maple sugar
Pueblo bread
 Salted salmon, an Inuit dish of brined salmon in a heavy concentration of salt water, left for months to soak up salts
Sapan, cornmeal mush, a staple of Lenape cuisine
Stink fish, an Inuit dish of dried fish, kept underground until ripe, for later consumption; also done with fish heads
Succotash, a dish of beans and corn
Sumac lemonade, a Native American beverage made from sumac berries
Tiswin, a term used for several fermented beverages in the Southwest, including a corn or fruit beer of the Apache and a saguaro fruit beer of the Tohono O'odham
Walrus flipper soup, an Inuit dish made from walrus flippers
Wojapi, a Plains Indian pudding of mashed, cooked berries

Restaurants

Indigenous cuisine of the Circum-Caribbean

This region comprises the cultures of the Arawaks, the Caribs, and the Ciboney. The Taíno of the Greater Antilles were the first New World people to encounter Columbus. Prior to European contact, these groups foraged, hunted, and fished. The Taíno cultivated cassava, sweet potato, maize, beans, squash, pineapple, peanut, and peppers. Today these cultural groups have mostly assimilated into the surrounding population, but their culinary legacy lives on.

Ajiaco, same as pepperpot, a soup believed to have originated in Cuba before Columbus' arrival. The soup mixes a variety of meats, tubers, and peppers.
Barbacoa, the origin of the English word barbecue, a method of slow-grilling meat over a fire pit.
Jerk, a style of cooking meat that originated with the Taíno of Jamaica. Meat was applied with a dry rub of allspice, Scotch bonnet pepper, and perhaps additional spices, before being smoked over fire or wood charcoal.
Casabe, a crispy, thin flatbread made from cassava root widespread in the Pre-Columbian Caribbean and Amazonia.
Bammy, a Jamaican bread made from cassava and water, today this bread is fried and made with coconut milk.
Guanime, a Puerto Rican food similar to the tamale; made with cornmeal or cornmeal and mashed cassave together. 
Pasteles, a dish that may have also been called hallaca and originated from Puerto Rico. Pasteles were once made with cassava and taro mashed into a masa onto a taro leaf. They are then stuffed with meat and wrapped.
Funche or fungi, a cornmeal mush.
Cassareep, a sauce, condiment, or thickening agent made by boiling down the extracted juices of bitter cassava root.
Mama Juana, a tea made in Hispaniola (Dominican Republic and Haiti).
Pepperpot, a spicy stew of Taíno origin based on meat, vegetables, chili peppers, and boiled-down cassava juice, with a legacy stretching from Cuba, Colombia coast and to Guyana.
Bush teas, popular as herbal remedies in the Virgin Islands and other parts of the Caribbean, often derived from indigenous sources, such as ginger thomas, soursop, inflammation bush, kenip, wormgrass, worry wine, and many other leaves, barks, and herbs.
Ouicou, a fermented, cassava-based beer brewed by the Caribs of the Lesser Antilles.
Taumali or taumalin, a Carib sauce made from the green liver meat of lobsters, chile pepper, and lime juice.

Indigenous cuisine of Mesoamerica

The pre-conquest cuisine of the Indigenous peoples of Mesoamerica made a major contribution to shaping modern-day Mexican cuisine, Salvadoran cuisine, Honduran cuisine, Guatemalan cuisine. The cultures involved included the Aztec, Maya, Olmec, Pipil and many more (see the List of pre-Columbian civilizations).

Some known dishes

Alegría, a candy made from puffed amaranth and boiled-down honey or maguey sap, in ancient times formed into the shapes of Aztec gods
Balché, Mayan fermented honey drink
Champurrado, a chocolate drink
Chili
Corn tortillas
Guacamole
Huarache
Mezcal
Mole
Pejelagarto, a fish with an alligator-like head seasoned with amashito chile and lime 
Pozole
Pulque or octli, an alcoholic beverage of fermented maguey juice
Pupusas, thick cornmeal flatbread from the Pipil culture of El Salvador
Salsa
Tacos
Tamales
Tepache, pineapple beer
Tlacoyos (gordita)
Xocolātl

Indigenous cuisine of South America

Andean cultures 

This currently includes recipes known from the Quechua, Aymara and Nazca of the Andes.

Grilled guinea pig, a native to most of the Andes region, this small rodent has been cultivated for at least 4000 years.
Fried green tomatoes, a nightshade relative native to Peru.
Saraiaka, a corn liquor.
Chicha, a generic name for any number of Indigenous beers found in South America. Though chichas made from various types of corn are the most common in the Andes, chicha in the Amazon Basin frequently use manioc. Variations found throughout the continent can be based on amaranth, quinoa, peanut, potato, coca, and many other ingredients.
Chicha morada, a Peruvian, sweet, unfermented drink made from purple corn, fruits, and spices. 
Colada morada, a thickened, spiced fruit drink based on the Andean blackberry, traditional to the Day of the Dead ceremonies held in Ecuador, it is typically served with guagua de pan, a bread shaped like a swaddled infant (formerly made from cornmeal in Pre-Columbian times), though other shapes can be found in various regions.
Quinoa porridge.
Ch'arki, a type of dried meat.
Humitas, similar to modern-day tamales, a thick mixture of corn, herbs and onion, cooked in a corn-leaf wrapping. The name is modern, meaning bow-tie, because of the shape in which it's wrapped.
Locro (from the Quechua ruqru) is a hearty thick stew popular along the Andes mountain range. It one of the national dishes of Argentina and Bolivia.
Mazamorra morada, a thick, sweet pudding made from ground purple corn and fruit. Sold in mix form in Peru.
Mate de coca, a Peruvian tea made from steeped coca leaves. It is commonly sipped by Indigenous people living at high altitudes in the Andes to prevent elevation illnesses.
Pachamanca, stew cooked in a hautía oven.
Papa a la Huancaína, Peruvian potatoes covered in a spicy, peanut-based sauce called Huancaína (Wan-ka-EE-na) sauce.
Patasca, spicy stew made from boiled maize, potatoes, and dried meat.
Ceviche, raw fish marinated in lime juice. One of Peru's national dishes.
Cancha or tostada, fried golden hominy.
Llajwa, salsa of Bolivia.
Llapingachos, mashed-potato cakes from Ecuador.
Tocosh (togosh), a traditional Quechua food prepared from fermented potato pulp.

Other South American cultures
Angu, an Indigenous Brazilian type of corn mush.
Arepa, a maize-based bread originating from the Indigenous peoples of Colombia and Venezuela.
Vori vori, a Paraguayan soup with cornmeal dumplings.
Cauim, a fermented beverage based on maize or manioc broken down by the enzymes of human saliva, traditional to the Tupinambá and other indigenous peoples of Brazil.
Chipa, a wide variety of corn flour or manioc-based breads traditional to Paraguay.
Curanto, a Chilean stew cooked in an earthen oven originally from the Chono people of Chiloé Island.
Kaguyjy, a Guarani-derived locro corn mush that become part of the national Paraguayan cuisine.
Kiveve, a sweet or savory dish from Paraguay consisting of puréed pumpkin and other ingredients cooked over a fire.
Lampreado or payaguá mascada, a starchy, manioc-based fried cake from Paraguay and the northeast of Argentina.
Lapacho or taheebo, a medicinal tree-bark infusion.
Maniçoba, dish of boiled manioc leaves and smoked meat indigenous to the Brazilian Amazon.
Mate (beverage).
Mbeju, a pan-cooked cake utilizing manioc starch.
Merken, an ají powder from the Mapuche of Patagonia.
Mocotó, a Brazilian stew with cow's feet, beans, and vegetables.
Moqueca, a Brazilian seafood stew.
Paçoca, from the Tupi "to crumble," describes two different dishes of pulverized ingredients: one with peanuts and sugar, and the other with dried meat, ground manioc, and onion.
Pamonha, a Brazilian tamale.
Pira caldo, Paraguayan fish soup.
Sopa paraguaya, a corn-flour casserole esteemed as the national dish of Paraguay, related to chipa guasu.
Soyo, shortened from the Guarani name so’o josopy, a Paraguayan soup based on meat crushed in a mortar.
Tacacá, a Brazilian stew of tucupi, jambu leaves, and shrimp, typically served in a dried gourd.
Tereré or ka'ay, a cold-brewed version of yerba mate.
Tucupi, manioc-based broth used in Brazilian dishes such as pato no tucupi and tacacá.
Yerba mate, a tea made from the holly of the same name, derived from Guaraní.

Cooking utensils

The earliest utensils, including bowls, knives, spoons, grinders, and griddles, were made from all kinds of materials, such as rock and animal bone. Gourds were also initially cultivated, hollowed, and dried to be used as bowls, spoons, ladles, and storage containers.

Many Indigenous cultures also developed elaborate ceramics for making bowls and cooking pots, and basketry for making containers. Nobility in the Andean and Mesoamerican civilizations were even known to have utensils and vessels smelted from gold, silver, copper, or other minerals.

Batan, an Andean grinding slab used in conjunction with a small stone uña
Burén, a clay griddle used by the Taíno.
Comal, a griddle used since Pre-Columbian times in Mexico and Central America for a variety of purposes, especially to cook tortillas.
Cuia, a gourd used for drinking mate in South America.
Metate, a stone grinding slab used with a stone mano or metlapil to process meal in Mesoamerica and one of the most notable Pre-Columbian artifacts in Costa Rica.
Molinillo, a device used by Mesoamerican royalty for frothing cacao drinks.
Molcajete, a basalt stone bowl, used with a tejolote to grind ingredients as a Mesoamerican form of mortar and pestle.
Paila, an Andean earthenware bowl.
Cooking baskets were woven from a variety of local fibers and sometimes coated with clay to improve durability. The notable thing about basket cooking and some native clay pot cooking is that the heat source, i.e. hot stones or charcoal, is used inside the utensil rather than outside. (Also see Cookware and bakeware.)

Crops and ingredients

Non-animal foods

Acorn—used to make flour and fertilizers for plants
Achira—edible tubercule
Achiote—annatto seed, a seasoning
Acuyo—a seasoning
Agarita—berries
Agave nectar—a sweetener
Allspice—a seasoning
Amaranth
American chestnut
Arazá
American lotus—seeds & root, leaves for baking coverings
Amole - can include Chlorogalum and Agave schottii
Aspen—inner bark and sap (both used as sweetener)
Avocado
Barbados cherry or acerola
Beans—throughout the Americas
Bear grass
Beautyberry
Beech nuts
Birch bark
Birch syrup—sweetener
Bitterroot
Blackberries
Blow wife seeds
Blueberries
Bodark seeds—also called Osage orange, hedge apple, monkeybrain
Bog rosemary—poisonous, but leaves can be brewed into tea regardless
Box elder—inner bark (used as sweetener)
Buckeye—(same rules apply as acorn)
Butia—palm fruits from South America
Buffalo gourd—(wild ancestor of all squash/ pumpkin)
Bur cucumber
Cacao
Cactus (various species)—fruits and young pads (see nopales)
California poppy seeds—(There are eastern American poppies also, but they are believed to have always been so rare, inclusion in the human diet is highly unlikely)
Camas root
Canella winterana—white cinnamon (used as a seasoning before cinnamon)
Cashew nuts
Cassava—primarily South America
Cattails—rootstocks
Century plant (mescal or agave)—crowns (tuberous base portion) and shoots
Chia seed
Chicle—chewing gum
Chili peppers (including bell peppers)—seasoning
Cherimoya
Chokecherries
Cholla fruits
Coca—South and Central America
Cow parsnip root
Cranberries
Crowberry
Culantro—used as a seasoning before cilantro
Currants
Custard-apple
Dandelion
Datil—fruit and flowers
Devil's claw
Dewberry
Dropseed grasses (various varieties)—seeds
Dwarf plantain
Eastern redbud—flowers as spice, fruit
Eastern red columbine—nectar only
Elderberries
Emory oak—acorns
Epazote—a seasoning
Feijoa—fruit from South America
 Ferns (various edible species, such as fiddleheads)
Gaylussacias or black huckleberry—grows near wild blueberries, tastes similar, but unrelated
Goji or wolf berry
Goldenberry
Gooseberries
Groundcherry—multiple species from North and South America
Guarana
Guava
Guaviyú
Hackberries
Hawthorn—fruit
Hazelnut or filbert
Hierba Luisa
Hueinacaztli, or ear-flower
Hickory nuts
Hogpeanut 
Holly
Hops
Horsemint
Huazontle
Huckleberries
Indian cucumber
Indian potato or hopniss, openowag, cinnamon vine, groundnut (cultivated in Japan as hodoimo, edible root bulbs and beans, dried flowers as spice)
Indigo bush—sources disagree whether edible, but presumably fruit?
Jack in the pulpit root
Jambú
Jerusalem artichoke
Jicama
Juniper berries
Kaniwa
Kentucky coffeetree
Kiwicha
Lamb's-quarters—leaves and seeds
Lapacho
Lechehuana honey
Lemon-verbena—lemon-flavoring herb
Lichen (certain species)
Lilypad root
Locust—blossoms and pods
Lúcuma
Maca
Maize—throughout the Americas, probably domesticated in or near Mexico, including the blue corn variety
Mamey
Manzanita
Maple syrup and sugar, used as the primary sweetener and seasoning in Northern America
Mesquite—bean pods, flour/meal
Mexican oregano
Milkweed
 Mint, various species—American mint is best known in eastern woodlands region
Mooseberry—called highbush cranberry in Eastern US—actually a type of Viburnum
Mulberries
Nopales—cactus
Okra
Onions
Oregon grape—(not a real grape)
Palmetto
Surinam cherry
Papaya
Passionfruit
Pawpaw
Peanuts (thought to be native to West Africa)
Pecans
Pennyroyal—American false variety
Persimmon
Pigweed —seeds
Pine (including western white pine and Pinus ponderosa)—inner bark (used as sweetener), sap as chewing gum ingredient, tips for jelly, cuttings for tea, and pinenuts
Pineapples—South America
Pinyon—nuts
Piñonero—nuts
Pipsissewa
Plum
Popcorn flower—herb
Potatoes—North and South America
Prickly pears
Prairie turnips
Pumpkins
Purslane—leaves
Quinoa—South America, Central America, and Eastern North America
Ramps—wild onion
Raspberries
Rice—imported by the Spanish
rock cress
Rose pepper
Sage
Saguaro cactus—fruits and seeds
Salt
Sangre de drago
Sapote
Sassafras
Screwbean—fruit
Sedge—tubers
Sea grape or uva de playa
Serviceberry—also juneberry, saskatoon
Shepherd's purse—leaves
Solomon's seal
Sotol—crowns
Soursop or guanábana
Spanish bayonet—fruit
Spanish lime or mamoncillo
Common spicebush—a seasoning
Spikenard—berries and roots for tea, some tribes ate roots (this is a select species, of which there are many in the America's and not all species are edible, though Natives had wide medicinal and practical uses)
Squash—throughout the Americas
Stevia—sweetener
Strawberries
Sumac—berries
Sunflower seeds
Sweet anise
Sweet potato—South America (misleading name: not a potato)
Sweetsop or sugar-apple
Tamarillo
Teaberry or wintergreen
Tobacco
Tomatillo
Tomato
Texas persimmons or sugar plum
Tuckahoe
Tulip poplar—syrup made from bark
Tule—rhizomes
Tumbleweed—seeds
Tumbo or taxo
Vanilla—a seasoning
Vetch—pods
Wapato root
White evening primrose—fruit
White walnuts or butternuts
 Wild carrot—also harbinger of spring, salt and pepper
Wild celery
Wild cherries
Wild grapes—fruit
Wild honey
Wild onion
Wild pea—pods
Wild roses
Wild sweet potato—(misleading name: not a potato)
Wood sorrel—leaves
Yacón—nectar
Yaupon holly—leaves
Yerba buena
Yerba mate
Yucca—blossoms, fruit, and stalks
Zamia—nuts

Hunted or livestock

Antelope
Armadillo
Badger
Bear
Beaver
Bighorn sheep
Bison—originally found throughout most of the North American plains
Burro—European import
Camel—extinct in the Americas
Capybara
Cattle—European import
Chipmunk
Deer
Dove
Duck
Elk
Ants
Geese
Ground hog
Grouse
Guanaco—hunted in South America by hunter-gatherer societies, for ex. in Patagonia until the 19th century
Guinea pig—domesticated in the Andes
Hog—important European import
Honey wasp—Brachygastra mellifica, Brachygastra lecheguana, and Polybia occidentalis, a source of honey found from the Southwestern United States to Argentina
Horse—although imported by Europeans, the horse was still very important to Indigenous cultures throughout the Americas (famously on the North American Plains) in the historic era
Hutia
Iguana
Livestock
Llama—domesticated in the Andes
Locust (cicada)
Manatee
Mastodon—extinct
Moose
Mourning dove
Mule—European import
Muscovy duck—domesticated in Mesoamerica
Opossum
Otter
Passenger pigeon—extinct
Peccaries
Pheasant
Porcupine
Prairie dog
Pronghorn (antelope)
Quail
Rabbit
Raccoon
Sheep—important European import
Skunk
Sloth
Stingless bee—Melipona beecheii and M. yucatanica, Mayan source of honey
Squirrel
Turkey
Turtle
Yacare caiman
Wood rat
Woolly mammoth—extinct

Notable chefs and food writers 

 Lois Ellen Frank
 Sean Sherman

See also

 
 House dish
 Hunter gatherer
 Locavores
 Tlingit cuisine
 Wild onion festival
 Inuit diet
 List of First Nations peoples
 Aboriginal food security in Canada
 Peasant food
 Staple food
 Soul food
 Bushmeat (Africa)
 Bushfood (Australia)
 Game (food)

References

Bibliography

External links

 Traditional Chiricahua recipes 
 American Indian Health and Diet Project

 
Cuisine
Cuisine
 
Latin American cuisine
North American cuisine
First Nations culture